Adugna is both a surname and a given name. Notable people with the name include:

Fisseha Adugna (born 1955), Ethiopian diplomat
Shimelis Adugna, Ethiopian diplomat
Adugna Deyas (born 1983), Ethiopian footballer

Surnames of Ethiopian origin